Glen Ewen is a village in the Canadian province of Saskatchewan within the Rural Municipality of Enniskillen No. 3 and Census Division No. 1. The village is located on the Canadian Pacific Railway just south of Provincial Highway 18. The towns of Carnduff and Oxbow are nearby.

The community was founded March 24, 1905 by a rail worker and Glen Ewen's first postmaster (Thomas Ewen). The town policy of tearing down any dwellings which have been vacated, combined with the current boom in the oilfield in this area, has resulted in a housing shortage for incoming workers. The school closed in November, 1989, and is now the Glen Ewen Communiplex.

In 2011, the new Glen Ewen Hotel opened, replacing the old hotel that had burned down in 2007.

History 
Glen Ewen incorporated as a village on March 24, 1904.

In 1959, the now defunct Glen Ewen Eagles were among the four founding teams of the men's senior Big 6 Hockey League. They never won a championship.

Demographics 

See also 
 List of communities in Saskatchewan
 Villages of Saskatchewan

References

External links

Villages in Saskatchewan
Enniskillen No. 3, Saskatchewan
Division No. 1, Saskatchewan